The Washington Senators baseball team was one of the American League's eight charter franchises.

The team was officially named the "Senators" during –, the Nationals during – and the Senators again during –, but nonetheless was commonly referred to as the Senators throughout its history (and unofficially as the "Grifs" during Clark Griffith's tenure as manager during –). The name "Nationals" appeared on the uniforms for only two seasons, and then was replaced with the "W" logo.

For a time, from 1911 to 1933, the Senators were one of the more successful franchises in Major League Baseball. The team's rosters included Baseball Hall of Fame members Goose Goslin, Sam Rice, Joe Cronin, Bucky Harris, Heinie Manush and one of the greatest players and pitchers of all time, Walter Johnson. But the Senators are remembered more for their many years of mediocrity and futility, including six last-place finishes in the 1940s and 1950s. Joe Judge, Cecil Travis, Buddy Myer, Roy Sievers and Eddie Yost were other notable Senators players whose careers were spent in obscurity due to the team's lack of success.

History

A losing start for a charter franchise
The new Washington club, like the old one, was called the "Senators" (the second of three franchises to hold the name). Jim Manning moved with the Kansas City club to manage the first Senators team.

The Senators began their history as a consistently losing team, at times so inept that San Francisco Chronicle columnist Charley Dryden famously joked, "Washington: First in war, first in peace, and last in the American League," a play on the famous line in Henry Lee III's eulogy for President George Washington as "First in war, first in peace, and first in the hearts of his countrymen". The 1904 Senators lost 113 games, and the next season the team's owners, trying for a fresh start, changed the team's name to the "Nationals" (and occasionally nicknamed the "Nats"). However, the "Senators" name remained widely used by fans and journalists — in fact, the two names were used interchangeably — although "Nats" remained the team's nickname.

A new era
Raised in rural Kansas, Johnson was a tall, lanky man with long arms who, using a leisurely windup and unusual sidearm delivery, threw the ball faster than anyone had ever seen. Over his 21-year Hall of Fame career, Johnson, nicknamed the "Big Train", won 417 games and struck out 3,508 batters, a major-league record that stood for more than 50 years.

In , the Senators' wooden ballpark burned to the ground, and they replaced it with a modern concrete-and-steel structure on the same location. A star pitcher with the National League's Chicago Colts in the 1890s, Griffith jumped to the AL in 1901 and became a successful manager with the Chicago White Sox and New York Highlanders. Walter Johnson blossomed in 1911 with 25 victories, although the Senators still finished the season in seventh place. In 1912, the Senators improved dramatically, as their pitching staff led the league in team earned run average and in strikeouts. Johnson won 33 games while teammate Bob Groom added another 24 wins to help the Senators finish the season in second place behind the Boston Red Sox. The Senators continued to perform respectably in 1913 with Johnson posting a career-high 35 victories, as the team once again finished in second place, this time to the Philadelphia Athletics. Starting in 1916, the Senators settled back into mediocrity.

1924: World champions

In 1924, Griffith named 27-year-old second baseman Bucky Harris player-manager. Led by the hitting of Goose Goslin and Sam Rice, and a solid pitching staff headlined by the 36-year-old Johnson, the Senators captured their first American League pennant, two games ahead of Babe Ruth and the New York Yankees.

The Senators faced John McGraw's heavily favored New York Giants in the 1924 World Series. Despite Johnson losing both of his starts, the Senators kept pace to tie the Series at three games apiece and force Game 7. The Senators trailed the Giants 3–1 in the eighth inning of Game 7, when Bucky Harris hit a routine ground ball to third which hit a pebble and took a bad hop over Giants third baseman Freddie Lindstrom. Two runners scored on the play, tying the score at three. In the ninth inning with the game tied, 3–3, Harris brought in an aging Johnson to pitch on just one day of rest – he had been the losing pitcher in Game 5. Johnson held the Giants scoreless into extra innings. In the bottom of the 12th inning, Muddy Ruel hit a high foul ball near home plate. The Giants' catcher, Hank Gowdy, dropped his protective face mask to field the ball but, failing to toss the mask aside, stumbled over it and dropped the ball, thus giving Ruel another chance to bat. On the next pitch, Ruel hit a double and, then proceeded to score the winning run when Earl McNeely hit a ground ball that took another bad hop over Lindstrom's head. It was the only World Series triumph for the franchise during their 60-year tenure in Washington.

Building a winning tradition

The Senators repeated as American League champions in  but lost the World Series to the Pittsburgh Pirates.

The change worked, as Washington posted a 99–53 record and swept to the pennant seven games ahead of the Yankees. But the Senators lost the World Series to the Giants in five games, and after that, the city would not host another World Series until , when the Washington Nationals, its current National League team, defeated the Houston Astros.

Fading fortunes
Attendance plunged as well, and after the season Griffith traded Cronin to the Red Sox for journeyman shortstop Lyn Lary and $225,000 in cash (even though Cronin was married to Griffith's niece, Mildred).

They continued their winning ways as one of the most dominant teams in professional baseball for the next two decades overpowering even the hapless third Senators franchise in 1961–1971.

The Senators were also the butt of many nationwide jokes during the 1950s, with the debut and running of a Broadway musical play in 1955 in New York City called "Damn Yankees" (based on an earlier best-selling novel and later movie in 1958), which followed a hapless elderly D.C. fan being given a "Faustian" or "devil's bargain," selling his soul to transform the team by becoming a young powerful new Senators player (played in the movie version by heart-throb leading-man actor Tab Hunter) and lead the lowly team to a pennant versus the Yankees.

In 1954, Senators scout Ossie Bluege, with help from longtime third base coach Alan Rupprecht, signed a 17-year-old Harmon Killebrew. Because of his $30,000 signing bonus, an enormous amount for that time, baseball rules required Killebrew to spend the rest of 1954 with the Senators as a "bonus baby." Killebrew bounced between the Senators and the minor leagues for the next few years.

Relocation
He sold Griffith Stadium to the city of Washington and leased it back, leading to speculation that the team was planning to move, as the Braves, Browns and Athletics had done in the early 1950s, and the Giants and Dodgers would do later in the decade. After an early flirtation with San Francisco (with a "Triple A" Pacific Coast League team, the San Francisco Seals), by  Griffith was courting Minneapolis–St. Paul in the Upper Midwest state of Minnesota, a prolonged process that resulted in his rejecting the Twin Cities' first offer before agreeing to relocate.

Photos

The Washington Senators in popular culture
The longtime competitive struggles of the team were fictionalized in the 1954 book The Year the Yankees Lost the Pennant, which became the 1955 Broadway musical Damn Yankees and the 1958 film starring then "heart-throb" leading-man actor Tab Hunter). The plot centers on Joe Boyd, a middle-aged real estate salesman and long-suffering fan of the Washington Senators baseball club. In this musical comedy-drama of the Faust legend, Boyd sells his soul to the Devil and becomes slugger Joe Hardy, the "long ball hitter the Senators need that he'd sell his soul for" (as spoken by him in a throwaway line near the beginning of the drama). His hitting prowess enables the Senators to win the American League pennant over the then-dominant Yankees. One of the songs from the musical, "You Gotta Have Heart", is frequently played at baseball games.

The (expansion) Washington Senators were mentioned several times in Tom Clancy's book Without Remorse. As they performed even worse than the team they replaced, they were the subject of an updated joke: "Washington: First in war, first in peace, and still last in the American League." When the current Nationals had their own struggles, the joke was updated once again, this time to "Washington: First in war, first in peace, and last in the National League."

See also
List of Minnesota Twins seasons

References

Washington Senators (1901–1960)
Washington Senators
Defunct baseball teams in Washington, D.C.
Baseball teams disestablished in 1960
Baseball teams established in 1901